Rende is a railway station on the Taiwan Railways Administration West Coast line located in Rende District, Tainan, Taiwan.

History
The station was opened on 10 January 2014.

See also
 List of railway stations in Taiwan

References

2014 establishments in Taiwan
Railway stations in Tainan
Railway stations opened in 2014
Railway stations served by Taiwan Railways Administration